Group 5 consisted of three of the 32 teams entered into the European zone: Bulgaria, France, and Republic of Ireland. These three teams competed on a home-and-away basis for one of the 8.5 spots in the final tournament allocated to the European zone. The spot would be assigned to the group's winner.

Standings

Matches

Notes

External links 
Group 5 Detailed Results at RSSSF

5
1976–77 in Bulgarian football
1977–78 in Bulgarian football
1976–77 in French football
1977–78 in French football
1976–77 in Republic of Ireland association football
1977–78 in Republic of Ireland association football